The 2019–20 Southeastern Conference men's basketball season began with practices in October 2019, followed by the start of the 2019–20 NCAA Division I men's basketball season in November. Conference play started in early January 2020 and will end in March, after which 14 member teams were to participate in the 2020 SEC men's basketball tournament at Bridgestone Arena in Nashville, Tennessee. The tournament champion was to have been guaranteed a selection to the 2020 NCAA Division I men's basketball tournament.

Preseason 
Kentucky was predicted to win the 2020 SEC championship in voting by a select panel of both SEC and national media members. Florida's Kerry Blackshear was the choice of the media for SEC Men's Basketball Player of the Year. Blackshear, Edwards, Hagans, Tyree and Perry were each All-SEC First Team selections.

Media Day Selections

() first place votes

Preseason All-SEC teams

 Players in bold are media choices for SEC Player of the Year

Head coaches

Note: Stats shown are before the beginning of the season. Overall and SEC records are from time at current school.

Rankings

Conference matrix

Postseason

SEC tournament

 March 11–15 at the Bridgestone Arena, Nashville. Teams will be seeded by conference record, with ties broken by record between the tied teams followed by record against the regular-season champion, if necessary.

Honors and awards

All-SEC Awards

Coaches

AP

References